The 2013 World Junior A Challenge was an international Junior "A" ice hockey tournament organized by Hockey Canada. It was hosted in Yarmouth, Nova Scotia, from November 4–10, 2013, at the Mariners Centre. The event included the 9th annual Canadian Junior Hockey League Prospects Game Challenge, marking the third time the two events have been paired together.

Teams
 Canada East (8th Appearance, 3rd as Hosts)
 Canada West (8th Appearance)
 Russia (8th Appearance)
 Switzerland (3rd Appearance)
 United States (7th Appearance)
 Czech Republic (3rd Appearance)

Background
Canada East, Canada West, Russia, United States, Switzerland, and Czech Republic all return.

Exhibition schedule

2013 Tournament

Group A

Group B

Results

Championship Round

Final standings

Statistics

Scorers

Goaltenders

Awards
Most Valuable Player:  Nick Schmaltz
All-Star Team
Forwards:  Nick Schmaltz,  Connor Hurley,  Kirill Pilipenko
Defense:  Neal Pionk,  Adam Plant
Goalie:  Maxim Tretiak

CJHL Prospects Game

For the third consecutive year, the Canadian Junior Hockey League Prospects Game was a part of the WJAC festivities.  Just like the previous four Prospects Games, the event was actually two "prospect" games with the President's Cup going to the winning goal aggregate.

Prospects East won their fourth President's Cup in nine years with an 8-4 aggregate victory (4-2, 4-2) over Prospects West.

Results

External links
HC's WJAC Website

World Junior A Challenge
World Junior A Challenge
World Junior A Challenge
Yarmouth, Nova Scotia